El Nido (Spanish for "The Nest") is a census-designated place in Merced County, California. The community had a population of 331 at the 2020 census.

History
El Nido was founded early in the 20th century when the development of irrigation enabled intensified farming of the area. El Nido is Spanish for "the nest", and the name is associated with the early Spanish land grant, Rancho Chowchilla. The El Nido School District was created in 1914, and a school building designed by William Bedesen was built in 1915. The El Nido Irrigation District was organized in 1928 and began supplying water for irrigation in 1932. Cotton was the principal crop in the area and a large gin was built there in 1937.

The US Army built the Potter Auxiliary Field (1942-1945) to train World War II pilots in El Nido.

The town has a post office, a tavern, a general store, a volunteer fire department, and an elementary school. After grade 8, students from El Nido must attend high school in Merced.

The first post office opened in 1920.

The ZIP Code is 95317. The town is inside area code 209.

Geography
According to the United States Census Bureau, the CDP covers an area of 3.3 square miles (8.5 km), all of it land.

Demographics
The 2010 United States Census reported that El Nido had a population of 330. The racial makeup of El Nido was 162 (49.1%) White, 0 (0.0%) African American, 7 (2.1%) Native American, 9 (2.7%) Asian, 0 (0.0%) Pacific Islander, 147 (44.5%) from other races, and 5 (1.5%) from two or more races. Hispanic or Latino of any race were 245 persons (74.2%).

The Census reported that 330 people (100% of the population) lived in households, 0 (0%) lived in non-institutionalized group quarters, and 0 (0%) were institutionalized.

There were 94 households, out of which 51 (54.3%) had children under the age of 18 living in them, 56 (59.6%) were opposite-sex married couples living together, 4 (4.3%) had a female householder with no husband present, 13 (13.8%) had a male householder with no wife present.  There were 7 (7.4%) unmarried opposite-sex partnerships, and 0 (0%) same-sex married couples or partnerships. 13 households (13.8%) were made up of individuals, and 4 (4.3%) had someone living alone who was 65 years of age or older. The average household size was 3.51.  There were 73 families (77.7% of all households); the average family size was 3.89.

The population was spread out, with 114 people (34.5%) under the age of 18, 35 people (10.6%) aged 18 to 24, 95 people (28.8%) aged 25 to 44, 60 people (18.2%) aged 45 to 64, and 26 people (7.9%) who were 65 years of age or older.  The median age was 27.7 years. For every 100 females, there were 121.5 males.  For every 100 females age 18 and over, there were 151.2 males.

The homeowner vacancy rate was 4.0%; the rental vacancy rate was 2.0%.  153 people (46.4% of the population) lived in owner-occupied housing units and 177 people (53.6%) lived in rental housing units.

Government

References

Further reading 
 Lim, Sarah. "Museum Notes: History of Planada and El Nido". Merced Sun-Star. August 6, 2005.

Census-designated places in Merced County, California
Census-designated places in California
El Nido, Merced